White Hill may refer to:

Locations on Earth 
White Hill, Ireland, a mountain of 630 metres located in County Wicklow, Ireland
White Hill (Forest of Bowland), a moor of 544 metres located in the Forest of Bowland, England
White Hill (Nova Scotia), at 535 metres, the highest elevation in Nova Scotia, Canada
White Hill, South Australia
White Hill Wind Farm, New Zealand

Locations on Mars 
 White Hill, Mars, part of the Apollo 1 Hills group on Mars

See also 
 Whitehill (disambiguation)
 White Hills (disambiguation)
 White Mountain (disambiguation)